The Journal of Philosophical Logic is a bimonthly peer-reviewed academic journal covering all aspects of logic. It was established in 1972 and is published by Springer Science+Business Media. The editors-in-chief are Rosalie Iemhoff (Utrecht University), Reinhard Muskens (University of Amsterdam), and Kai Wehmeier (University of California, Irvine).

Abstracting and indexing
The journal is abstracted and indexed in:
Arts and Humanities Citation Index
Current Contents/Arts & Humanities
EBSCO databases
International Bibliography of Periodical Literature
Linguistic Bibliography/Bibliographie Linguistique
Modern Language Association Database
Philosopher's Index
ProQuest databases
Scopus
Zentralblatt MATH

References

External links 

Logic journals
English-language journals
Publications established in 1972
Springer Science+Business Media academic journals
Bimonthly journals